The Memory Machine  is the debut studio album by Australian singer-songwriter Julia Stone. It was released in September 2010 in Australia and peaked at number 73 on the ARIA Charts.

Reception

Duncan McLeod from The AU review called it "a subtle album that weaves its magic on the listener. Stone's unique vocals wash over you and warm your insides. The rich cleverness of strings, the imagery of a timid girl almost whispering into the microphone, the power in the paired back sound that highlights Stone's clever writing.". McLeod called out "Catastrophe!", "The Memory Machine", "My Baby" and "Where Does the Love Go" as the album highlights.

Craig Mathieson from Sydney Morning Herald said "The Memory Machine is a kind of liberating event, although most tracks touch on inhibition and restriction" adding "this disquieting, unexpected set is her best work yet."

Ally Carnwath from The Guardian said on her debut solo effort Stone can "indulge her more fanciful impulses" adding "But whatever mood her compositions achieve is soon nobbled by the grating effect of her ickle-girl vocals and twee lyrics."

Tom Lordan from GoldFlake Paint said the album is "a gentle, often dark and insightful journey into a young woman's life. In the album's short time frame she deals eloquently with large themes: love, sex, loneliness and the inability to feel. Her lyrics are like a child's painting after his/her parents have gone through a divorce: they're simple, tightly focused, raw and vulnerable."

Track listing

Charts

Release history

References

2010 debut albums
Julia Stone albums
EMI Records albums
Independiente Records albums
Nettwerk Records albums
PIAS Recordings albums